The casing of a submarine is a light metal structure, usually incorporating a deck, built over the upper surface of the vessel's pressure hull.

The pressure hull of a submarine is usually cylindrical and possesses a low freeboard when in the water, which makes walking on the hull when on the surface dangerous in high seas or rough weather. The casing provides a flat and therefore  safer platform for personnel to walk on.

The casing is outside the pressure hull and free-flooding so is usually perforated with numerous holes, allowing water to enter and trapped air to escape easily, eliminating any buoyancy contributed by the casing and allowing the submarine to submerge with as little delay as possible.

Casings have been eliminated since the end of World War II as the flow of water through the numerous flood-holes creates noise that may be detected by an enemy using passive sonar, as well as causing hydrodynamic drag.

Submarine design